(born 2 July 1956) is a Japanese former fencer. She competed in the women's individual and team foil events at the 1984 Summer Olympics.

References

External links
 

1956 births
Living people
Japanese female foil fencers
Olympic fencers of Japan
Fencers at the 1984 Summer Olympics